Aegilops tauschii, the Tausch's goatgrass or rough-spike hard grass, is an annual grass species. It is native to Crimea, the Caucasus region, western and Central Asia, Afghanistan, Pakistan, the western Himalaya, and parts of China, and has been introduced to other locales, including California.

Taxonomy
Aegilops tauschii is part of the tribe Triticeae, along with wheat. It is a diploid (2n=2x=14, DD) goat grass species which has contributed the D genome to common wheat.

Subspecies
The following subspecies are accepted:

Aegilops tauschii subsp. strangulata  – western part of range
Aegilops tauschii subsp. tauschii

References

tauschii
Wheat
Grasses of Asia
Flora of the Crimean Peninsula
Flora of the Caucasus
Flora of Western Asia
Flora of Central Asia
Flora of West Himalaya
Flora of Pakistan
Flora of Xinjiang
Flora of North-Central China
Flora of Southeast China
Plants described in 1849